"While I'm Dancin'" is a 2002 single by rappers Common and Prime. It is produced by DJ JS-1 and Dub-L, who put the song on their 2004 compilation Ground Original Presents: Claimstake. It can be found on mixtapes such as DJ Food Stamp's Best of Common and DJ JS-1's The Common Collection.

Track listing

A-side
 "While I'm Dancin' (Clean w/ Vocal Hook)"
 "While I'm Dancin' (Clean w/ Scratches)"
 "While I'm Dancin' (Instrumental)"

B-side
 "While I'm Dancin'" (Remix - Clean w/ Scratches)"
 "While I'm Dancin'" (Remix - Instrumental)"

See also
List of Common songs

2002 singles
Common (rapper) songs
2002 songs
Songs written by Common (rapper)